William Morton may refer to:

Law and politics
William Morton (MP for Leicester) (fl. 1386–1388), MP for Leicester
William Morton (MP for Berwick-upon-Tweed) (fl. 1584–1593), MP for Berwick-upon-Tweed
William Morton (judge) (1605–1672), English judge and MP
William Morton (American politician) (fl. 1886–1888), mayor of Lancaster, Pennsylvania
William Morton (Manitoba politician) (1884–1958), Canadian politician

Sports
William Morton (boxer), American boxer, see Boxing at the 1955 Pan American Games
William Morton (cricketer) (1961–2019), Scottish cricketer
William Morton (cyclist) (1880–1952), Canadian cyclist
William Morton (footballer), English footballer
Bill Morton (American football) (1909–1987), American football player

Others
W. L. Morton (1908–1980), Canadian historian
William T. G. Morton (1819–1868), American dentist, the first to publicly use ether anesthesia
William Morton (tenor) (1912-1995), Canadian opera singer
William H. Morton (1877–1947), British locomotive engineer and General Manager of the Great Southern Railways of Ireland
William J. Morton (1845–1920), American physician
William Morton (priest) (born 1956), Dean of Derry
William Morton (theatre manager) (1839–1939), amusement caterer and theatre and cinema manager in England

See also
Bill Morton (disambiguation)
Billy Morton, American burglar and underworld figure, also known as Billy Porter
William Moreton (1641–1715), Anglican bishop in Ireland
William Moreton (judge) (c. 1696 – 1763), English judge